David Douděra (born 31 May 1998) is a Czech footballer who plays as a right midfielder or right-back for Czech First League side Slavia Prague.

Career

Dukla Prague
Douděra joined FK Dukla Prague at the age of 15. After good appearances for Dukla Prague's B-team, Douděra got his official debut for the club in a Czech First League against Sigma Olomouc on 29 September 2017. He started on the bench, but replaced Róbert Kovaľ in the 62nd minute. He played 10 games further in the 2017–18 season, five as a starter and the rest from the bench. In the following season, he became a regular starter with 30 league appearances, 21 of them as a starter. However, Dukla was relegated to the Czech National Football League for the 2019–20 season.

Mladá Boleslav
On 20 December 2019 it was confirmed that Douděra would join Mladá Boleslav from 2020. He made his debut for the team on 14 February 2020 against SK Dynamo České Budějovice.

Career statistics

Club

References

External links
 
 David Douděra at FAČR
 
 

1998 births
Living people
Association football midfielders
Association football defenders
Czech footballers
Czech National Football League players
Czech First League players
SC Xaverov players
FK Viktoria Žižkov players
FK Dukla Prague players
FK Mladá Boleslav players
SK Slavia Prague players
Czech Republic youth international footballers
Czech Republic under-21 international footballers
People from Brandýs nad Labem-Stará Boleslav
Sportspeople from the Central Bohemian Region